The 1998 Makarska International Championships was a women's tennis tournament played on outdoor clay courts in Makarska in Croatia that was part of Tier IV of the 1998 WTA Tour. It was the inaugural and only edition of the tournament and was held from 13 April through 19 April 1998. Unseeded Květa Hrdličková, who entered the main draw as a qualifier, won the singles title.

Finals

Singles

 Květa Hrdličková defeated  Fang Li 6–3, 6–1
 It was Hrdličková's 1st title of the year and the 1st of her career.

Doubles

 Tina Križan /  Katarina Srebotnik defeated  Karin Kschwendt /  Evgenia Kulikovskaya 7–6, 6–1
 It was Križan's only title of the year and the 2nd of her career. It was Srebotnik's only title of the year and the 1st of her career.

References

External links
 WTA tournament edition details
 ITF tournament edition details

Makarska International Championships
Tennis tournaments in Croatia
Makarska International Championships
Makarska International Championships
Makarska International Championships 
Makarska International Championships